Stefan Espeland (born 24 March 1989) is a Norwegian professional ice hockey defenceman. He is currently an unrestricted free agent who most recently played for EC Red Bull Salzburg of the ICE Hockey League (ICEHL). He previously played for Eisbären Berlin of the Deutsche Eishockey Liga (DEL).

He joined Berlin after a one year tenure with fellow German club, the Fischtown Pinguins in the 2019–20 season. He formerly played with Vålerenga of the GET-ligaen.

International play
He was named to the Norway men's national ice hockey team for competition at the 2014 IIHF World Championship.

Career statistics

Regular season and playoffs

International

References

External links

1989 births
Living people
Borås HC players
Eisbären Berlin players
Fischtown Pinguins players
Ilves players
EC KAC players
Lørenskog IK players
Modo Hockey players
Norwegian ice hockey defencemen
Norwegian expatriate sportspeople in Austria
Norwegian expatriate sportspeople in Sweden
Ice hockey players at the 2018 Winter Olympics
Olympic ice hockey players of Norway
Ice hockey people from Oslo
EC Red Bull Salzburg players
IF Sundsvall Hockey players
Vålerenga Ishockey players